Masone is a surname. Notable people with the surname include:

 Giovanni Masone ( 1453– 1510), Italian painter
 Sandra Masone, American boom operator

See also
 Mason (surname)
 Masone (disambiguation)